Malmö Fotbollförening, commonly called Malmö FF, is a Swedish professional association football club based in Malmö, whose first team play in the highest tier of Swedish football, Allsvenskan, as of the 2017 season. Malmö FF was founded on 24 February 1910 by 19 members of a predecessor club named BK Idrott who, for a short time, had been merged with cross-town rivals IFK Malmö. After participating in regional competitions and national cup play in Svenska Mästerskapet during the 1910s, Malmö FF joined Sweden's newly created national league system in 1920, and played in the second tier of Swedish football for the next decade – with the exception of one season in Svenska Serien, then unofficially the top football league in Sweden. Allsvenskan was established as Sweden's official first tier in 1924, and Malmö FF first took part in 1931.

The Swedish Football Association prohibited professionalism until 1967, and Malmö FF were demoted in 1934 for having paid players. They were promoted back in 1936, and have since had several periods of consistent success, most notably in the early 1950s, the 1970s, the 1980s, and 2010s. The pinnacle of the club's history came in 1979, when, as finalists in both the European Cup and Intercontinental Cup, Malmö FF were ranked as one of the strongest clubs in the world. After winning a record five consecutive Allsvenskan titles between 1985 and 1989, the club won nothing during the 1990s and were relegated for the first time in 1999, though they returned to the top flight a year later. They have since remained in Allsvenskan, and won an additional five league titles.

As of the end of the 2016 season, Malmö FF have played 105 seasons, 95 of which have been spent within the Swedish league system. The club have contested Allsvenskan 81 times, and have won the competition on 22 occasions. Malmö FF have been demoted once (in 1934) and relegated once (in 1999); their 63 successive Allsvenskan seasons between 1936 and 1999 is a league record. Their worst league finish to date is sixth in the second tier, their placing at the end of the 1926–27 season. The 1950 season was Malmö FF's best in terms of league performance: the team were unbeaten all year, won 20 out of 22 league games, and collectively scored 82 league goals, a club record which still stands. Hans Håkansson holds the record for most league goals for Malmö FF during a single season; he scored 30 goals in 18 matches during the 1935–36 season in the  second-tier. Excluding second-tier seasons, however, the record belongs to Bo Larsson, whose tally of 28 goals in 22 games during 1965 remains unmatched today.

History

When Malmö FF was founded in 1910, there was no established official league system in Swedish football. The club therefore competed in two cup competitions: the nationally organised Svenska Mästerskapet, and Distriktsmästerskapet, the regional championship of Scania. The team's best performances during these early years were when they reached the Svenska Mästerskapet quarter-finals in 1920, and the Distriktsmästerskapet final twice, in 1916 and 1918. The club would go on to win Distriktsmästerskapet 27 times before the competition was abolished in 1966.

The Swedish Football Association introduced an official league system in 1920, and placed Malmö FF in a regional section of the second tier, Division 2 Sydsvenska Serien. Malmö FF won the league in its first season, and were promoted to Division 1 Svenska Serien Västra, one of the first-tier divisions. However, they were relegated back to Division 2 Sydsvenska Serien after a single season. Achieving mid-table positions in this league, Malmö FF stayed in the second tier after it was renamed Division 2 Södra for the 1928–29 season. The club won Division 2 Södra at the end of the 1930–31 season and were promoted to Allsvenskan for the first time since the new national first-tier league had been established before the 1924–25 season. Malmö FF remained in Allsvenskan until 1934, when the club was found to have paid players in spite of the league's then-mandatory amateurism, which remained in place until 1967. For this, they were demoted to Division 2 Södra; several players and members of staff were banned. Malmö FF won the Division 2 Södra title at the first attempt, but failed to win the play-offs which decided promotion back to Allsvenskan. They retained the title the following year, 1936, and this time won the promotion play-offs.

Over the following decade, Malmö FF established themselves as a permanent fixture in Allsvenskan. The side had a period of great success in the late 1940s and early 1950s, when they finished within the top three in Allsvenskan for ten years in a row, securing five league titles. The club also won the main Swedish cup tournament, Svenska Cupen (established in 1941), five times during the same period. The club continued to finish in the upper half of the league table and experienced additional periods of success during the late 1960s and the 1970s. Malmö FF also qualified for European competition arranged by The Union of European Football Associations (UEFA), doing so for the first time during the 1964–65 season when they entered the European Cup (qualifying as Allsvenskan leaders during the European summer, as Sweden had switched to a season format based around the calendar year). The club qualified for continental competitions 12 times in a row between 1971 and 1982.

During the 1980s and 1990s, the Swedish FA experimented with the competition format: between 1982 and 1990, the Swedish championship was given to the winners of a play-off held between the four best-placed Allsvenskan teams. A championship league was contested by the top six clubs in the league in 1991 and 1992. The pre-1982 format was then restored. Malmö FF won Allsvenskan a record five times in a row between 1985 and 1989, but only won the play-offs in 1986 and 1988. After a brief successful period in the mid-1990s, the club began to decline in Allsvenskan and found themselves relegated in 1999, the first time since 1936 they were out of the top division. The team were relegated to the newly created Superettan.

Malmö FF won promotion back to Allsvenskan after only one season in Superettan, and once again established themselves as a successful top-level club during the first decade of the 21st century. After a meagre season in 2001, they finished in the top three for three successive seasons between 2002 and 2004, and won their first Allsvenskan title since 1989 in 2004. Malmö FF then became a mid-table team as they finished between the fifth and ninth positions during the latter part of the decade, before they won the league once more in 2010, the club's centenary year. This earned the club qualification into Svenska Supercupen, an annual Super Cup match inaugurated in 2007 in which the Allsvenskan champions face the winners of Svenska Cupen. Malmö FF lost the 2011 edition 2–1 to regional rivals Helsingborgs IF. Following the 2010 championship winning year Malmö FF won bronze and small silver medals before winning the gold medal once more in 2013. After this they won Svenska Supercupen for the first time with a win against rivals IFK Göteborg. This was the first time since the 1989 season that the club won two official titles in the same season. In 2014 Malmö FF defended the league title for the first time since 1989 and the Swedish championship for the first time since 1975. In the same season Malmö FF also became the first Swedish club to play in the group stage of the UEFA Champions League in fourteen years.

Key
Key to competitions

 Allsvenskan (AS) – Sweden's top football league, established in 1924
 Superettan (SE) – The second tier of Swedish football, held since 2000
 Division 1 (D1) – The third tier of Swedish football as of 2016. Was the unofficial first tier named Svenska Serien when Malmö FF contested Division 1 Svenska Serien Västra (a regional division) during the 1922–23 season.
 Division 2 (D2) – The fourth tier of Swedish football as of 2016. Was the second tier when Malmö FF played in various regional divisions of the league in the 1920s and 1930s.
 Svenska Mästerskapet – a cup held between 1896 and 1925 to decide the Swedish football champions

 Svenska Cupen (SC) – Sweden's national cup, first contested in 1941. Was not held between 1954 and 1966, or in 1992.
 Svenska Supercupen (SSC) – Sweden's super cup, organised between 2007 and 2015. It was an annual one-off match between the respective winners of Allsvenskan and Svenska Cupen.
 Allsvenskan play-offs (CPO) – the play-off format which decided the Swedish football champions between 1982 and 1990. Were contested by the four best-placed clubs in Allsvenskan each year.
 Mästerskapsserien (MS) – a short-lived league, held in 1991 and 1992, in which the top six teams of the year's Allsvenskan league season would compete for the Swedish football championship

Key to colours and symbols

Allsvenskan specifics

Key to league record
 Season = The year and article of the season
 Pos = Final position
 Pld = Games played
 W = Games won
 D = Games drawn
 L = Games lost
 GF = Goals scored
 GA = Goals against
 Pts = Points
 Att = Average attendance
Key to European competitions
 EC = European Cup
 CL = UEFA Champions League
 ICFC = Inter-Cities Fairs Cup
 CWC = UEFA Cup Winners' Cup
 UC = UEFA Cup
 ICC = Intercontinental Cup
 UIC = UEFA Intertoto Cup
 EL = UEFA Europa League

Key to cup record
 n/a (not applicable) = Indicates that Malmö FF did not participate in cup play because there was no competition for this year
 En-dash (–) = An en-dash indicates that Malmö FF did not participate in cup play because the club failed to qualify
 DNE = The club did not enter cup play
 PPO = Promotional play-offs
 QR = Qualification round
 QR1 = First qualification round
 QR2 = Second qualification round
 QR3 = Third qualification round
 PO = Play-offs stage
 GS = Group stage
 R1 = First round
 R2 = Second round
 R3 = Third round
 R4 = Fourth round
 R5 = Fifth round
 R6 = Sixth round
 QF = Quarter-finals
 SF = Semi-finals
 RU = Runners-up
 W = Winners

Seasons

1910–1919

Since 1920

Footnotes

A.  The title of "Swedish Champions" has been awarded to the winner of four different competitions over the course of Swedish football history. Between 1896 and 1925 the title was awarded to the winner of Svenska Mästerskapet, a stand-alone cup tournament. No club were given the title between 1926 and 1930, even though a first-tier league, Allsvenskan, was contested. In 1931, the title was reinstated and thereafter awarded to the winners of Allsvenskan. Between 1982 and 1990, a play-off round was held in cup format at the end of the league season to decide the national champions. In 1991, the play-offs were replaced by Mästerskapsserien, an additional league round held following Allsvenskan to decide the title-winners. After two editions, Mästerskapsserien too was abolished. Since the 1993 season, the winners of Allsvenskan have been awarded the national championship.
B.  According to Allsvenskan tradition, players and staff of the best four teams, rather than the best three, are awarded medals. The winners are awarded the "gold" medal, the runners-up the "big silver" medal, the team finishing third the "small silver" medal and the team finishing in fourth place the "bronze" medal. The principle of awarding four medals rather than three has its root in the Svenska Mästerskapet of the early 20th century, in which both losing semi-finalists would receive bronze medals as no third-place match would be played. Only Allsvenskan uses this system; this list therefore does not use it to denote league finishes in lower divisions.
C.  Malmö FF played no competitive football during the 1910 season.
D.  The 1917 Svenska Mästerskapet and 1917 Distriksmästerskapet are part of the 1916–17 season due to the fact that the season format changed to the calendar year format for the 1918 season.
E.  Only competitions which are part of UEFA's official European record are included here. The Inter-Cities Fairs Cup, though a non-UEFA competition, is officially recognised as UEFA Cup's precursor, and is therefore also incorporated into this list. The 1979 Intercontinental Cup co-hosted by UEFA and CONMEBOL is also included in this list.
F.  Malmö FF played no competitive football during the 1921–22 season.
G.  Malmö FF were disqualified from the competition and demoted a division as punishment for paying players in spite of Swedish Football Association rules prohibiting professionalism among its member clubs. Professional players were first allowed by the Swedish Football Association in 1967.
H.  All Allsvenskan clubs decided not to enter the 1948 Svenska Cupen due to several key players participating in the football tournament at the 1948 Summer Olympics in London. Sweden won the gold medal after defeating Yugoslavia in the final.
I.  The 1990 season saw the introduction of three points for a win.

See also
 The Invincibles (football)

References
 General
  (in Swedish)
 Specific

External links
Malmö FF official website

Seasons
 
Malmo Ff
Malmo FF seasons